The 2001–02 season was the 102nd season in Società Sportiva Lazio's history and their 14th consecutive season in the top-flight of Italian football.

First-team squad
Squad at end of season

Left club during season

Transfers

Winter

Results

Serie A

League table

Results by round

Results summary

Matches

Coppa Italia

Quarterfinals

Champions League

Third Qualifying Stage

 Copenhagen–Lazio 2-1
 0-1 Hernán Crespo (56)
 1-1 Jacob Laursen (73 pen)
 2-1 Heine Fernandez (76)
 Lazio–Copenhagen 4-1
 1-0 Hernán Crespo (48)
 2-0 Hernán Crespo (63)
 3-0 Claudio López (65)
 3-1 Sibusiso Zuma (81)
 4-1 Stefano Fiore (90)

Group stage

Group D

Statistics

Appearances and goals

|-
! colspan=14 style=background:#dcdcdc; text-align:center| Players transferred out during the season

References

S.S. Lazio seasons
Lazio